Ronayne may refer to:

Ronayne  is a surname. Notable people with the surname include:

John Ronayne (1931-2009), Violinist
Jim Ronayne (1877–1936), Irish hurler
Jim Ronayne (born 1959), Gaelic footballer
Joseph Philip Ronayne (1822–1876), Irish civil engineer
Shane Ronayne, Gaelic football manager

Ronayne is a masculine given name:
Patrick Ronayne Cleburne (1828–1864), Irish and later American soldier
Ronayne Marsh-Brown (born 1984), Guyanese footballer

References

Masculine given names